Hetephernebti was a queen of the Third Dynasty of the Old Kingdom of ancient Egypt. She was the only known wife of Pharaoh Djoser.

Hetephernebti and a King’s Daughter Inetkaes were named on stelae found around Djoser’s Saqqara pyramid complex and on a Heliopolis relief showing Djoser accompanied by the two of them.

Among her titles were “one who sees Horus” (m33.t-ḥrw-) and “great of sceptre” (wr.t-ht=s), both common for important queens in this period, also, she was called “King's Daughter”, which means she was possibly a daughter of Djoser's predecessor Khasekhemwy and Nimaathap, thus a sister or half-sister of her husband.

Sources

Queens consort of the Third Dynasty of Egypt
27th-century BC women
Djoser